The Restaurant at Meadowood was a Michelin Guide 3-star restaurant at the Meadowood Napa Valley resort in Napa Valley, USA which specialized in local, sustainable California cuisine. The restaurant applied a "slightly more modern approach" with the use of emulsifiers, gelling agents and stabilizers.

On September 28, 2020, The Restaurant at Meadowood was destroyed in the Glass Fire. In the immediate aftermath of the fire, the resort owners said they intend to ultimately rebuild the restaurant. Since the fire, the restaurant staff has been establishing temporary residencies and serving dinners at a few places around California and the United States, including the Ojai Valley Inn in Southern California.

Awards
 2013 Three Michelin Stars, Michelin Guide San Francisco Bay Area & Wine Country 2013
 2013 #2 on Bon Appétit magazine's “The 20 Most Important Restaurants in America”
 2012 Three Michelin Stars, Michelin Guide San Francisco Bay Area & Wine Country 2012
 2011 Three Michelin Stars, Michelin Guide San Francisco Bay Area & Wine Country 2011
 2010 Four Stars, San Francisco Chronicle
 2010 Two Michelin Stars, Michelin Guide San Francisco Bay Area & Wine Country 2010
 2009 Two Michelin Stars, Michelin Guide San Francisco Bay Area & Wine Country 2009 
 2008 Two Michelin Stars, Michelin Guide San Francisco Bay Area & Wine Country 2008

See also
 List of Michelin 3-star restaurants
 List of Michelin 3-star restaurants in the United States

References

Buildings and structures in Napa County, California
Michelin Guide starred restaurants in California
Restaurants established in 1979
Restaurants in the San Francisco Bay Area
St. Helena, California
1979 establishments in California
James Beard Foundation Award winners
Burned buildings and structures in the United States
2020 disestablishments in California
Restaurants disestablished in 2020
Buildings and structures demolished in 2020